Paula Maly (21 October 1891 – 19 October 1974) was an Austrian painter. Her work was part of the painting event in the art competition at the 1948 Summer Olympics.

References

1891 births
1974 deaths
20th-century Austrian painters
Austrian women painters
Olympic competitors in art competitions
Artists from Vienna